is a Japanese manga series written and illustrated by Shunju Aono. It was serialized in Shogakukan's seinen manga magazine Weekly Big Comic Spirits from November 2015 to September 2016. The series was adapted into a live-action TV drama in 2017 by Netflix and TV Tokyo co-production starring Yojiro Noda, lead vocalist of Radwimps.

Plot
Shin Michima is an unpopular novelist. He has lived with five mysterious women in the same house for half a year. Minami Shirakawa loves coffee. Hitomi Tsukamoto loves black tea, yoga and reading good books. Yuki Kobayashi is a polite woman and loves roasted green tea. Midori Suzumura is a high school student and loves acerola juice. Nanaka Seki loves drinking milk.

These five women pay Shin a million yen every month for rent and living expenses, about 30x higher than normal. They have rules in the house and questions about the women are banned.

Characters
Shin Michima

A 31-year old novelist struggling to produce a bestseller, often criticized by his literary rivals and the women in the household about his lack of good quality writing. His father is condemned on death row following the murder of three victims including Shin's mother, her lover, and a policeman who had arrived at the scene after they were killed. Shin receives daily accusatory messages on the fax machine from an anonymous sender.
Minami Shirakawa

A nudist at home who has a mysterious demeanor and occasionally violent tendencies. President of the ultra-luxury Call Girl Club. Minami refers to Shin as "Novel".
Hitomi Tsukamoto

Hitomi is the daughter of influential novelist, Hibiki Ogie, who had died 11 years ago. She appears to be infatuated with Shin, often becoming frustrated when he does not pick up on her subtle hints.
Yuki Kobayashi
Portrayed by: 
She basically stays in her room. Married to a wealthy elderly man for whom she was previously a maid.
Midori Suzumura

A 17-year old high school girl. Midori was raised in an orphanage since her relinquishment by her parents at the age of three. As she got older, Midori took on part-time work to save for her independence from the orphanage and its unconventional rules. She had bought a lottery ticket and won one billion Yen prior to moving into the house and she appears to have feelings for Shin.
Nanaka Seki

She is very clumsy and loves drinking milk. As a famous actress, Nanaka began her career as a child.

Media

Manga
Written and illustrated by Shunju Aono, Million Yen Women was serialized in Shogakukan's seinen manga magazine Weekly Big Comic Spirits from November 16, 2015, to September 5, 2016. Shogakukan collected its chapters in four tankōbon volumes, released from March 30 to November 30, 2016.

Volume list

Drama
The live-action drama stars Yojiro Noda, who is the lead vocalist of the rock band Radwimps, in his first television show. Five beautiful but mysterious women move in with unsuccessful novelist Shin, who manages their odd household in exchange for a tidy monthly sum. The theme song is "漂う感情" (Drifting Emotions) by Kotringo. The series aired on TV Tokyo and Netflix Japan from April to June 2017 and became available on Netflix US on August 15, 2017.

See also
I'll Give It My All... Tomorrow, another manga series by the same author

Notes

References

External links
Manga Million Yen Women official manga website  at Big Comics 
 

2017 Japanese television series debuts
2017 Japanese television series endings
Japanese drama television series
Japanese television dramas based on manga
Japanese-language Netflix original programming
Romantic comedy anime and manga
Seinen manga
Shogakukan manga
TV Tokyo original programming